The Fender Bullet Bass is an electric bass guitar model produced by Fender.  It was introduced in 1982 as a part of a new line of guitars meant to replace the outgoing Mustang and Musicmaster - Fender's so called "student" guitars.  The Bullet Bass had Mustang style pickups, but was available with a standard 34" neck in addition to the short scale 30" neck that the Mustang had.  These instruments were only produced in the US for a couple years until Fender decided to transfer Bullet production to Japan in 1983/84.  They then fell under Fender's newly active Squier branding.

Unlike the Mustang, the Fender Bullet line has not been reissued by Fender.

See also
Fender Bullet

Literature
Peter Bertges: The Fender Reference; Bomots, Saarbrücken 2007, 

Bullet Bass
Musical instruments invented in the 1980s